District 64 is a district of the Texas House of Representatives that serves all of Wise County and the northwest portion of Denton County. The current representative for district 64 is Republican Lynn Stucky, who succeeded Myra Crownover on January 9, 2017.

Following the 2020 Census, redistricting took place in 2021. These changes will take effect in the upcoming 2022 election cycle.

The district contains most of the city of Denton, where most of its population is located. In addition, all of Decatur, Krum, New Fairview, Aurora, Runaway Bay, Alvord, Newark, and Bridgeport call the district home. The district also includes the University of North Texas, Texas Woman's University, and the Denton County campus of North Central Texas College.

Lake Bridgeport is in the far west portion of the district.

US 380 runs horizontally through the entirety of the district. In the eastern portion, I-35 runs vertically through the city of Denton.

Prior incarnations of District 64
During the 1980s the district was located in West Texas.  It is most notable as the home district (1984–1990) of Rick Perry who would later become Governor of Texas.

From 2002 to 2012, and 2012 to 2022, the district was located wholly within Denton County. It was one of three districts serving the county in the latter decade.

List of representatives

References

External links
District 64 information

064
Denton County, Texas